Evelyn Ebhomien (born 15 February 1981) is a Nigerian weightlifter. She competed in the women's lightweight event at the 2000 Summer Olympics.

References

External links
 

1981 births
Living people
Nigerian female weightlifters
Olympic weightlifters of Nigeria
Weightlifters at the 2000 Summer Olympics
Place of birth missing (living people)
20th-century Nigerian women
21st-century Nigerian women